Senegalia hayesii is a species of plant in the family Fabaceae.  It is native to Bolivia, Costa Rica, Guatemala, Honduras, Mexico, Panamá, and Venezuela.

Description 
Senegalia hayesii is a woody, clambering vine. The branches are  a densely covered in  very short soft hairs and have  many small prickles. The bipinnate leaves are 30 to 40 cm. long, with 8 to 10 pairs of pinnae, each having 10-20 pairs of final leaflets. the midvein of the  leaves is excentric. The  flowers occur in spikes which are 10–12 mm long, and have calyces 2 mm long, with corollas 4 mm long.

Taxonomy
It was first described by George Bentham in 1875 as Acacia hayesii, from a specimen collected in Panama by S. Hayes, and was redescribed in 1928 by Nathaniel Lord Britton and Joseph Nelson Rose as ''Senegalia hayesii.

References

hayesii
Plants described in 1875